Jiang Wei's Northern Expeditions refer to a series of eleven military campaigns launched by the state of Shu Han against its rival state, Cao Wei, between 240 and 262 CE during the Three Kingdoms period in China. The campaigns were led by Jiang Wei, a prominent Shu general. Unlike the previous Northern campaigns led by Zhuge Liang, which added Wudu and Yinping commanderies to Shu Han state territories, Jiang Wei's campaigns ended up being unpopular in both the military and civil circles in Shu. Also unlike Zhuge Liang's campaigns which often featured 60,000 to sometimes even 100,000 Shu Troops, Jiang Wei's were often much smaller rarely exceeding 30,000 even after the death of Fei Yi, where Jiang Wei assumed control of the military. The Zhuge Liang campaigns did suffer from  logistical and supply issues for their large army. Zhuge's successor Jiang Wan, believed that it was the Hanzhong's mountainous terrain itself that were to blame for the campaigns failures and attempted to switch the route thru the Han river. Fei Yi, who succeeded Jiang Wan, agreed, and never allowed any large campaigns to be launched by Hanzhong. Jiang Wei however overlooked these concerns and used Hanzhong as his home base as Zhuge Liang did.

Each campaign was ultimately aborted due to inadequate food supplies, heavy losses on the battlefield, or other reasons. The campaigns drained Shu's already limited resources and preceded the eventual fall of Shu in 263.

In popular culture and the 14th-century historical novel Romance of the Three Kingdoms, the campaigns were erroneously referred to as the "nine campaigns on the Central Plains" (九伐中原). This description is inaccurate because there were actually eleven campaigns instead of nine, and the battles were fought in locations far from the Central Plains.

Prelude

In 227, China was divided into three competing regimes – Cao Wei, Shu Han and Eastern Wu – each with the purpose of reunifying the territories of the fallen Han dynasty under its own control. Between 228 and 234, Zhuge Liang, the chancellor-regent of Shu, had led a series of five campaigns to attack Wei, but each campaign ultimately proved unsuccessful and the overall result was a stalemate. Zhuge Liang died of illness during the fifth campaign in 234. After Zhuge Liang's death, Jiang Wan and Fei Yi, who consecutively succeeded him as the regents of Shu, discontinued his aggressive foreign policy towards Wei and focused more on domestic policies and internal development. There was a six-year-long period of relative peace between Shu and Wei until 240, when the Shu general Jiang Wei decided to follow-up on Zhuge Liang's legacy and continue launching attacks on Wei.

First expedition (240)

In 240, Jiang Wei led Shu forces to attack the Wei-controlled Longxi Commandery. In response, the Wei general Guo Huai led his forces to attack the enemy and drove them towards territory controlled by the Qiang tribes. Jiang Wei withdrew his troops and returned to Shu. In the meantime, Guo Huai attacked the Qiang tribes led by Midang (迷當) and defeated them. He also received the surrender of over 3,000 Di tribal clans, whom he relocated to the Guanzhong region (present-day central Shaanxi).

Second expedition (247)
In 247, the Qiang tribes, led by Ehe (餓何), Shaoge (燒戈), Fatong (伐同), Ezhesai (蛾遮塞) and others, started a rebellion against Wei in four commanderies: Longxi (around present-day Dingxi, Gansu), Nan'an (南安; around present-day Wushan County, Gansu), Jincheng (金城; around present-day Lanzhou, Gansu) and Xiping (西平; around present-day Xining, Qinghai). They attacked several cities and towns in the area, and called for Shu forces to support them.

Baihuwen (白虎文) and Zhiwudai (治無戴), two influential tribal kings in Liang Province, responded by rebelling against Wei. When Jiang Wei led Shu forces into Liang Province to support the Qiang rebels, Baihuwen and Zhiwudai submitted to him.

The Wei imperial court ordered Xiahou Ba to lead troops to garrison at the flank. When Guo Huai and his forces showed up at Didao (狄道; around present-day Lintao County, Gansu), his advisers suggested that they should attack Fuhan County (枹罕縣; in present-day Linxia County, Gansu) and pacify the Qiang tribes first before dealing with the invading Shu forces. Guo Huai predicted that Jiang Wei would attack Xiahou Ba's position, so he headed south to reinforce Xiahou Ba. As he expected, Jiang Wei did attack Xiahou Ba at the west of the Tao River, but retreated when Guo Huai and his reinforcements showed up. Guo Huai then moved on to attack the Qiang rebels, killed Ehe and Shaoge, and forced the thousands of Qiang tribal clans to surrender.

Third expedition (248)
In 248, Ezhesai (蛾遮塞) and the Qiang rebels occupied fortresses in Heguan (河關; in the vicinity of present-day Dingxi, Gansu) and Baitu (白土; in present-day Minhe County, Qinghai) counties and used them as defences against Wei forces across the Tao River. Guo Huai pretended that he was going to attack from upstream, but actually secretly ordered his troops to cross the river downstream to attack Baitu. The assault was successful and the rebels were defeated. Zhiwudai (治無戴) led his tribal forces to attack Wuwei Commandery but left his family in Xihai Commandery (西海郡; near the Juyan Lake Basin, Inner Mongolia). When Guo Huai learnt about it, he led his troops to attack Xihai Commandery, but encountered Zhiwudai and his forces, who were on their way back from Wuwei Commandery. The two armies clashed at the north of Longyi County (龍夷縣; west of present-day Huangyuan County, Qinghai), with the Wei forces emerging victorious and Zhiwudai's forces retreating.

Jiang Wei led Shu forces from Shiying (石營; northwest of present-day Xihe County, Gansu) to Qiangchuan (彊川; west of present-day Lintan County, Gansu) to rendezvous with Zhiwudai and his retreating troops. He left Liao Hua behind in Chengzhong Mountain (成重山; west of present-day Lintao County, Gansu) to build a fortress and gather the remaining Qiang forces and keep them as hostages in the fortress. When Guo Huai heard about Jiang Wei's advances, he wanted to divide his forces into two groups to attack the enemy. His officers, however, had a different opinion. They expected to Jiang Wei to head west to meet Zhiwudai and combine their forces, while Liao Hua would remain behind to defend the Shu position at Chengzhong Mountain. If they split their army into two, their attacking power would be greatly reduced, and they might end up in a situation where they were able to neither resist Jiang Wei nor capture Liao Hua's position. They urged Guo Huai to concentrate on advancing westward to attack Jiang Wei and Zhiwudai separately before they could meet up.

Guo Huai stood by his initial plan and said: "If we attack Liao Hua, we can catch the enemy off guard. Jiang Wei will then definitely turn back to save Liao Hua. By the time he returns, we would have already defeated Liao Hua. By doing so, we can make Jiang Wei and his men weary from travelling forth and back. If Jiang Wei does not meet the barbarians, the barbarians will retreat on their own. This is the best approach." He then instructed Xiahou Ba to lead one detachment to pursue Jiang Wei towards Tazhong (沓中; northwest of present-day Zhugqu County, Gansu), while he led the other group to attack Liao Hua. As Guo Huai foresaw, Jiang Wei did turn back to save Liao Hua and failed to meet up with Zhiwudai.

Fourth expedition (249)
In the spring of 249, the Wei regent Cao Shuang was deposed and executed in a coup launched by his co-regent Sima Yi, who then held full control of the Wei government. Xiahou Ba was then a subordinate of Xiahou Xuan, who held the position of General Who Attacks the West (征西將軍). Xiahou Xuan was a relative of both Xiahou Ba and Cao Shuang. After Cao Shuang's death, Sima Yi summoned Xiahou Xuan back to the capital, Luoyang, and replaced him with Guo Huai. Guo Huai thus became Xiahou Ba's new commanding officer. Xiahou Ba had all along not been on good terms with Guo Huai, so he feared that he would end up like Cao Shuang, hence he fled and defected to Shu.

In autumn, Jiang Wei led Shu forces to attack the Wei-controlled Yong Province, had two fortresses constructed at Qushan (麴山; southeast of present-day Min County, Gansu), and ordered his officers Ju An (句安) and Li Xin (李歆) to guard them. He also contacted the Qiang tribes and requested assistance from them in harassing the commanderies in Yong Province. Guo Huai discussed with Chen Tai, the Inspector of Yong Province, on how to deal with the Shu invasion. Chen Tai said: "The fortresses at Qushan may be well-defended, but the roads leading into Shu are difficult to travel, so they will require a sufficient amount of supplies. The Qiang tribes are worried about this weakness of the Shu army, so they may not be willing to help Shu. If we surround the fortresses and attack them, we can easily capture them. Even if Shu reinforcements arrive, the dangerous mountainous terrain will cause them to be worn out."

Guo Huai then ordered Chen Tai, Xu Zhi and Deng Ai to lead Wei forces to attack the fortresses at Qushan and cut off their food and water supplies. Ju An and Li Xin led their men to taunt Deng Ai to attack them, but Deng Ai ignored them. As time passed, the two fortresses gradually ran out of supplies. Jiang Wei led his troops from Mount Niutou (牛頭山; west of present-day Zhaohua District, Guangyuan, Sichuan) to reinforce the fortresses. They encountered Chen Tai and his troops along the way. Chen Tai said: "The Art of War says that the best way to win a battle is to win without fighting. If we manage to occupy Mount Niutou, Jiang Wei's return route will be sealed off and he can be easily captured by us." He then ordered his troops to build forts to resist Jiang Wei's forces but refrain from engaging the enemy. At the same time, he also wrote to Guo Huai and requested his help in attacking Mount Niutou. Guo Huai did so and led his troops across the Tao River in preparation for attacking Mount Niutou.

After Jiang Wei retreated, Ju An and Li Xin became isolated at the fortresses at Qushan, so they had no choice but to surrender to the enemy. Guo Huai then led his troops further west to attack the restless Qiang tribes and forced them to surrender. Deng Ai cautioned him: "The enemy did not retreat far. They might turn back to attack us again, so we should split up our forces in case they attack us again."

Deng Ai remained behind and garrisoned at the north of Baishui (白水; in present-day Qingchuan County, Sichuan). Three days later, Jiang Wei sent Liao Hua to lead a force to approach Deng Ai's camp from the south of Baishui. Deng Ai told his officers: "Jiang Wei has turned back to attack us. We have few troops. Ideally, we should cross the river and not build a bridge. I believe Jiang Wei must have sent Liao Hua to hinder us so that we are forced to remain here, while he would attack Taocheng (洮城; northeast of present-day Min County, Gansu) from the east." Taocheng was located north of the river and was about 60 li away from Deng Ai's position. Deng Ai immediately dispatched troops to travel overnight to Taocheng to defend the fortress. As he expected, Jiang Wei crossed the river to attack Taocheng, but failed to capture the fortress because Deng Ai had already strengthened its defences. Faced with no other viable options, Jiang Wei withdrew his forces back to Shu.

Fifth expedition (250)
In 250, Jiang Wei led Shu forces to attack the Wei-controlled Xiping Commandery (西平郡; around present-day Xining, Qinghai). He retreated after failing to capture the commandery.

Sixth expedition (253)
In the summer of 253, Shu's ally state, Eastern Wu, launched an attack on Wei's eastern borders, leading to the Battle of Hefei.

Jiang Wei prided himself on his familiarity with the cultures and customs of the Qiang and other non-Han Chinese tribes living in western China. As such, he often thought of inducing these tribal peoples to ally with Shu and launch a coordinated attack on the Wei-controlled territories in present-day Gansu. However, Fei Yi, the Shu regent, strongly disapproved of Jiang Wei's warmongering behaviour towards Wei, and attempted to rein Jiang Wei in by limiting the number of troops he led into battle each time to no more than 10,000. He once told Jiang Wei that they should stop attacking Wei and focus on policies promoting internal stability and prosperity in Shu.

On 16 February 253, Fei Yi was assassinated by Guo Xiu (郭脩), a defector from Wei, during a party on the first day of the Chinese New Year. After Fei Yi's death, Jiang Wei gained greater control over Shu's armed forces and could do as he wished. In the summer of that year, after learning of the Wu attack on Wei in the east, Jiang Wei led tens of thousands of Shu troops from Shiying (石營; northwest of present-day Xihe County, Gansu) to besiege Didao (狄道; around present-day Lintao County, Gansu).

The Wei regent Sima Shi summoned Yu Song (虞松) to seek his opinion on how to deal with the Wu and Shu incursions in the east and west respectively. Yu Song analysed the situation and said that the defences at Hefei were strong enough to resist the Wu attack for some time and that the Wu forces would eventually withdraw once they lost momentum. He suggested that they launch a swift counterattack on the Shu invaders to catch them off guard and drive them back. Sima Shi agreed and ordered Guo Huai and Chen Tai to lead the Wei forces stationed in the Guanzhong region to attack Jiang Wei and lift the siege on Didao. Chen Tai attacked the enemy at Luomen (洛門; in present-day Wushan County, Gansu). Jiang Wei eventually pulled out his troops when they ran out of food supplies.

Seventh expedition (254)
In the summer of 254, Jiang Wei led Shu forces to attack Longxi Commandery again. Li Jian (李簡), the Wei official in charge of Didao (狄道; around present-day Lintao County, Gansu), surrendered to Jiang Wei. Jiang Wei then pressed further to attack Xiangwu County (襄武縣; southeast of present-day Longxi County, Gansu) and engaged the Wei general Xu Zhi in battle. Xu Zhi was defeated and killed, but the Shu army also lost a general, Zhang Ni. The victorious Shu forces then occupied three counties – Didao, Heguan (河關; in the vicinity of present-day Dingxi, Gansu) and Lintao – and forced the residents to relocate to Shu-controlled territory.

Eighth expedition (255)

In 255, when Jiang Wei announced his plan to the Shu imperial court to launch another campaign against Wei, Zhang Yi openly objected to Jiang Wei's idea and pointed out that Shu lacked the resources to go to war and that the people were already tired of war. Jiang Wei ignored him and led a Shu army comprising tens of thousands of troops, with Zhang Yi and Xiahou Ba as his deputies, to attack Wei. Between 18 September and 17 October, the Shu army reached Fuhan County (枹罕縣; northeast of present-day Linxia County, Gansu) and prepared to attack Didao (狄道; present-day Lintao County, Gansu).

In the meantime, Wang Jing, the Wei-appointed Inspector of Yong Province, reported the Shu invasion to the general Chen Tai. After Guo Huai died in 255, Chen Tai had succeeded him as General Who Attacks the West (征西將軍) and was now in charge of military affairs in Yong and Liang provinces. Wang Jing reported to Chen Tai that the Shu forces had split into three groups to separately attack Mount Qi (祁山; the mountainous regions around present-day Li County, Gansu), Shiying (石營; northwest of present-day Xihe County, Gansu) and Jincheng Commandery (金城郡; around present-day Yuzhong County, Gansu). He then requested permission from Chen Tai to lead troops to attack the enemy at Fuhan County and Mount Qi. Chen Tai analysed the situation and concluded that the Shu army's power would be reduced if they split into three groups to attack Liang Province, so he replied Wang Jing and told him to wait and closely observe the enemy's movements first, and then later they would launch a pincer attack on the enemy from the east and west.

When Chen Tai and his reinforcements reached Chencang (陳倉; east of present-day Baoji, Shaanxi), Wang Jing had already been defeated by Jiang Wei at Gu Pass (故關) and retreated across the Tao River. Chen Tai was worried that Wang Jing might not be able to defend the Wei position at Didao, so he led his troops to reinforce Didao. Wang Jing clashed with Jiang Wei at the west bank of the Tao River and was defeated. Left with about 10,000 men, Wang Jing retreated to Didao while his remaining troops were scattered or killed.

Jiang Wei took advantage of the momentum to press on and besiege Didao. At this point in time, Zhang Yi told Jiang Wei: "It's time to stop. We shouldn't advance any further, or we will risk losing everything we have gained so far. Advancing further is equivalent to adding legs to a snake."

In the meantime, Chen Tai, who was at Shanggui County (上邽縣; in present-day Tianshui, Gansu), split up his forces and ordered them to advance day and night to quickly capture and defend strategic locations in the area. The Wei imperial court appointed Deng Ai as acting General Who Stabilises the West (安西將軍) and ordered him to lead troops to assist Chen Tai in resisting the Shu invasion. Days later, the Grand Commandant (太尉) Sima Fu also led backup forces to reinforce Chen Tai. Wei reinforcements led by Deng Ai, Hu Fen (胡奮) and Wang Mi (王秘) arrived in Shanggui County to join Chen Tai's forces. They split into three groups and advanced towards Longxi Commandery. Earlier on, Chen Tai had disagreements with the other officers on how to lift the siege on Didao. Deng Ai and the other officers said that the Shu army's morale was high after defeating Wang Jing, so they should retreat first and hold up in a strategic location, while waiting for an opportunity to strike back. Chen Tai, on the other hand, argued that they should launch a swift assault and decisively defeat the Shu army before it could take advantage of its high morale to conquer more Wei territories and garner strong support from the Qiang and Di tribes.

Chen Tai then led his troops across Gaocheng Ridge (高城嶺; northwest of present-day Weiyuan County, Gansu), travelling stealthily day and night, and arrived at the hills southeast of Didao. At the hills, Chen Tai ordered his men to light more fires and beat their war drums loudly to signal to the besieged Wei forces in Didao that reinforcements had arrived. As he expected, the Wei defenders in Didao experienced a surge in their morale, and the Shu forces were taken by surprise. Jiang Wei ordered his troops to retreat. Chen Tai also instructed his men to spread false news that they were planning to cut off the Shu army's retreat route. When Jiang Wei heard about it, he became fearful, so he withdrew his forces on 11 November. The siege on Didao was thus lifted.

When Chen Tai was retreating back to Longxi Commandery, he predicted that Jiang Wei would attempt to make use of the mountainous terrain along the way to lay an ambush, so he took a southern detour back to Longxi. As he expected, Jiang Wei had indeed sent troops to lie in ambush for three days. However, the historian Pei Songzhi pointed out that it made no sense for Jiang Wei to set up the ambush because he did not know that Wei reinforcements would show up when he was besieging Didao so the ambush would not have served its purpose.

After the siege on Didao was lifted, Wang Jing sighed in relief: "Our supplies wouldn't have lasted more than 10 days. If reinforcements didn't show up, the city would have fallen to the enemy and the whole province could have been lost." Chen Tai settled the troops and strengthened the defences in the area before returning to the garrison at Shanggui County. Jiang Wei retreated back to Zhongti (鐘堤; south of present-day Lintao County, Gansu).

Ninth expedition (256)
While Jiang Wei and the Shu forces retreated to Zhongti (鍾提; south of present-day Lintao County, Gansu), many Wei officers believed that the enemy was already exhausted by then and would not attack them again.

Deng Ai had a different opinion. He said: "The defeat at the west of the Tao River wasn't an insignificant loss. The loss of troops and officers, depletion of stores and reserves, and displacement of refugees are signs pointing towards imminent destruction. I shall explain the situation. First, the enemy is riding on a wave of victories, while we're actually weak. Second, the enemy forces are well-trained and battle-ready, while ours are newly recruited and not well-equipped. Third, the enemy is less tired than us because we travel by land while they travel by water. Fourth, the enemy focuses on attacking Didao only, while we spread our defences across four locations – Didao, Longxi, Nan'an (南安; around present-day Wushan County, Gansu) and Mount Qi (祁山; the mountainous regions around present-day Li County, Gansu). Fifth, Nan'an and Longxi have grain produced by the Qiang people, while there are fields of wheat beyond Mount Qi. The enemy is cunning. They'll definitely come for the wheat."

In the autumn of 256, as Deng Ai predicted, Jiang Wei led troops from Zhongti to attack Mount Qi but was repelled by the defences set up by Deng Ai earlier. Jiang Wei then headed to Dong Village (董亭; south of present-day Wushan County, Gansu) while Deng Ai stationed his troops at Mount Wucheng (武城山; in present-day Chencang District, Baoji, Shaanxi). Jiang Wei tried to seize control of the mountainous terrain from Deng Ai, but was driven back. That night, Jiang Wei attempted to cross the Wei River to attack Shanggui (上邽; present-day Tianshui, Gansu). Deng Ai intercepted Jiang Wei at Duan Valley (段谷; southwest of present-day Tianshui, Gansu) and defeated him. 

Deng Ai was promoted to General Who Guards the West (鎮西將軍) and put in charge of overseeing military affairs in the region. The reason for Jiang Wei's defeat at Shanggui was the failure of the Shu general Hu Ji to show up in time with reinforcements to assist Jiang Wei. The failure of this ninth expedition resulted in Shu sustaining heavy losses of lives and resources; the people of Shu resented and hated Jiang Wei even more. Jiang Wei wrote a memorial to the Shu imperial court, requesting to be demoted as punishment. The court approved and demoted him to the position of General of the Guards (衞將軍). However, despite his demotion, Jiang Wei was still allowed to act in the capacity of his previous appointment as General-in-Chief (大將軍).

Tenth expedition (257–258)
In 257, when the Wei general Zhuge Dan started a rebellion in Shouchun (壽春; around present-day Shou County, Anhui), the Wei government mobilised troops from the Guanzhong region to suppress the revolt. Jiang Wei wanted to take advantage of the situation to stage another invasion of Wei so he led Shu forces through Luo Valley (駱谷) and Shen Ridge (沈嶺), both located south of present-day Zhouzhi County, Shaanxi, to attack the Wei garrisons near the Great Wall. Around the time, the Wei garrisons had much supplies stored there but were weakly defended. The Wei defenders started panicking when they heard of the Shu army's approach.

The Wei general Sima Wang led his troops to resist the invaders while his colleague Deng Ai led a separate force from Longyou (隴右; around present-day Lintao County, Gansu) to support him. When the Wei forces reached the Great Wall, Jiang Wei ordered his troops to retreat to Mangshui (芒水; southeast of present-day Zhouzhi County, Shaanxi) and set up a camp with its back facing a mountain. Sima Wang and Deng Ai ordered their troops to surround Jiang Wei's camp but refrain from attacking. When Jiang Wei led his men to taunt the Wei forces to attack them, Sima Wang and Deng Ai gave strict orders to their troops to ignore the enemy.

In 258, after Jiang Wei received news that Wei forces had suppressed Zhuge Dan's rebellion, he withdrew all his forces and returned to the Shu capital, Chengdu. The Shu emperor Liu Shan restored him to the position of General-in-Chief (大將軍).

At the time, having seen year after year of military campaigns against Wei, the people of Shu were growing tired of having to endure the costs and effects of war. The Shu official Qiao Zhou wrote the "Chou Guo Lun" (仇國論; "Disquisition on Rivalling States"), a satirical piece criticising Jiang Wei for his warmongering behaviour.

Eleventh expedition (262)
In the spring of 262, when Jiang Wei planned to launch another campaign against Wei again, the Shu general Liao Hua remarked: "'One who does not refrain from using military force will end up burning himself.' I am referring to Boyue (Jiang Wei). He is inferior to the enemy in terms of intelligence and military power, yet he keeps attacking them. How can he expect to overcome them?"

In winter, Jiang Wei occupied Taoyang County (洮陽縣; in present-day Lintao County, Gansu) and attacked the Wei general Deng Ai at Houhe County (侯和縣) but lost the battle. He retreated to Tazhong (沓中; northwest of present-day Zhugqu County, Gansu) and garrisoned there.

Aftermath

While Jiang Wei was aggressively leading Shu forces to attack Wei year after year, the campaigns had taken a toll on Shu's resources but failed to yield any significant gains. In the years after the death of the Shu chancellor Dong Yun in 246, the eunuch Huang Hao came to power and indirectly controlled the Shu government. Huang Hao wanted to remove Jiang Wei from his position of power and replace him with Yan Yu (閻宇), whom he favoured. When Jiang Wei heard about it, he wrote to the Shu emperor Liu Shan to accuse Huang Hao of corruption and treachery, and urge Liu Shan to execute Huang Hao. However, Liu Shan replied, "Huang Hao is merely a minor official. In the past, I hated it when he got into conflict with Dong Yun. Why should you mind him?" Jiang Wei saw that Huang Hao had many supporters in the imperial court and realised that he had gotten himself into trouble when he openly denounced Huang Hao. Hence, he decided to retreat to Tazhong and garrison there instead of returning to the capital, Chengdu.

In 262, the Wei regent Sima Zhao had the intention of launching a campaign to conquer Shu. In 263, three separate Wei armies led by Zhong Hui, Deng Ai and Zhuge Xu invaded Shu. While Jiang Wei led Shu forces to hold off Zhong Hui and Zhuge Xu's forces at the mountain pass Jiange (劍閣; in present-day Jiange County, Sichuan), the Wei army led by Deng Ai took a more dangerous route across mountainous terrain, bypassed Shu's defences, and showed up at the Shu capital, Chengdu. The Shu emperor Liu Shan, having been taken by surprise, voluntarily surrendered to Deng Ai, thus bringing an end to the Shu state's existence.

In Romance of the Three Kingdoms
The expeditions are covered in chapters 107, 109–115 in the 14th-century historical novel Romance of the Three Kingdoms, which dramatises and romanticises the events before and during the Three Kingdoms period. They were referred to as the "nine campaigns on the Central Plains" (九伐中原). This description is inaccurate because historically there were eleven campaigns instead of nine, and the battles were fought in locations far from the Central Plains.

In popular culture
Some of the expeditions are featured as playable stages in the seventh instalment of Koei's Dynasty Warriors video game series. However, the battles are not necessarily in chronological order.

Notes

References
Citations from the Sanguozhi

Citations from the Sanguozhi zhu

Citations from the Zizhi Tongjian

 Chen, Shou. Records of the Three Kingdoms (Sanguozhi).
 Luo, Guanzhong. Romance of the Three Kingdoms (Sanguo Yanyi).
 Pei, Songzhi. Annotations to Records of the Three Kingdoms (Sanguozhi zhu).
 Sima, Guang. Zizhi Tongjian.

Campaigns of the Three Kingdoms